Teófilo is a given name. People with the name include:

Teófilo Barrios (born 1964), Paraguayan football (soccer) defender
Teófilo Benito (1966–2004), Spanish middle-distance runner
Teófilo Borunda (1912–2001), Mexican politician
Teófilo Braga (1843–1924), Portuguese politician, writer and playwright
Teófilo Carvalho dos Santos (1906–1986), Portuguese politician
Teófilo Chantre (born 1964), Cape Verdean musician
Teófilo Cruz (1942–2005), Puerto Rican professional basketball player
Teófilo Cubillas (born 1949), Peruvian former footballer
Teófilo Dias (1854–1889), Brazilian poet, journalist and lawyer, nephew of Gonçalves Dias
Teófilo Ferreira (born 1973), Brazilian international freestyle swimmer
Teófilo Forero (died 1989), Colombian politician and trade unionist
Teófilo Gutiérrez (born 1985), Colombian football player
Teófilo José Jaime María Le Guillou, the founder in 1823 of Vieques, Puerto Rico
Teófilo Marxuach, (1877–1939), ordered the first U.S. shot fired in World War I
Teofilo Rossi (1865–1927), Italian lawyer and politician
Teófilo Stevenson (1952–2012), Cuban boxer
Teofilo Vargas Sein, the leader of the Mita Congregation, a Christian church in Puerto Rico
Teófilo Villavicencio Marxuach (1912–1992), pioneer in Puerto Rican radio broadcasting
Teófilo Yldefonso (1903–1943), Filipino swimmer in the breaststroke

See also
Rodolfo Teófilo, Fortaleza, neighborhood in Fortaleza, Ceará, Brazil	
Teófilo Otoni, city in northeast Minas Gerais state, Brazil	
Roman Catholic Diocese of Teófilo Otoni
Teofilo (horse) a notable Irish racehorse.

Spanish masculine given names